Alejandro Sánchez Camacho (born 26 August 1960) is a Mexican politician affiliated with the PRD. He served as Deputy of both the LX and LXII Legislatures of the Mexican Congress representing the Federal District.

On August 17, 2012 he was appointed as General Secretary of the PRD.

References

1960 births
Living people
People from Mexico City
Party of the Democratic Revolution politicians
21st-century Mexican politicians
Deputies of the LXII Legislature of Mexico
Members of the Chamber of Deputies (Mexico) for Mexico City